Maen Roch is a commune in the department of Ille-et-Vilaine, western France. The municipality was established on 1 January 2017 by merger of the former communes of Saint-Brice-en-Coglès (the seat) and Saint-Étienne-en-Coglès.

Population

See also
Communes of the Ille-et-Vilaine department

References

Communes of Ille-et-Vilaine

Communes nouvelles of Ille-et-Vilaine
Populated places established in 2017
2017 establishments in France